The men's 69 kg (151.8 lbs) Light-Contact category at the W.A.K.O. World Championships 2007 in Belgrade was the third lightest of the male Light-Contact tournaments falling in between the welterweight and light middleweight divisions when compared to Low-Kick and K-1's weight classes.  There were twenty-two men from three continents (Europe, Africa and South America) taking part in the competition.  Each of the matches was three rounds of two minutes each and were fought under Light-Contact rules. 

Due to an unequal number of competitors for a tournament designed for thirty two contestants, nine of the men had a bye through to the second round.  The tournament gold medallist was Poland's Przemyslaw Ziemnicki who won the tournament without having to fight in the final as both his potential opponents, Russia's Evgeny Mayer and Hungary's László Szabó were disqualified in their semi final match.  This meant that there was no silver medal winner in the category and only one bronze, which went to Ziemnicki's semi final opponent - Croatian Dejan Cepic.

Results

* Evgeny Mayer and László Szabó both disqualified - there will be no silver or bronze medal for either fighter

Key

See also
List of WAKO Amateur World Championships
List of WAKO Amateur European Championships
List of male kickboxers

References

External links
 WAKO World Association of Kickboxing Organizations Official Site

Kickboxing events at the WAKO World Championships 2007 Belgrade
2007 in kickboxing
Kickboxing in Serbia